Rebelle may refer to:

the original French language title of War Witch, a Canadian film released in 2012
the French language title of Brave (2012 film), an American animated film
Rebelle (fragrance), a fragrance released by Rihanna
Rebelles, a Canadian political magazine

Rebelle Records, a record company founded by Swedish Singer Björn Afzelius in 1988